Prince Dun of the First Rank, or simply Prince Dun, was the title of a princely peerage used in China during the Manchu-led Qing dynasty (1636–1912). As the Prince Dun peerage was not awarded "iron-cap" status, this meant that each successive bearer of the title would normally start off with a title downgraded by one rank vis-à-vis that held by his predecessor. However, the title would generally not be downgraded to any lower than a feng'en fuguo gong except under special circumstances.

The first bearer of the title was Miankai (綿愷; 1795–1838), the Jiaqing Emperor's third son, who was made "Prince Dun of the First Rank" in 1821. The title was passed down over four generations and held by five persons.

Members of the Prince Dun peerage

 Miankai (綿愷; 1795–1838), the Jiaqing Emperor's third son, made a junwang (second-rank prince) in 1819, promoted to qinwang (first-rank prince) in 1821 under the title "Prince Dun of the First Rank", demoted to junwang in 1827 but restored as qinwang in 1828, demoted to junwang again in 1838, posthumously restored as qinwang in 1838 and honoured as Prince Dunke of the First Rank (惇恪親王)
 Yizuan (奕纘; 1818–1821), Miankai's eldest son, held the title of a buru bafen fuguo gong, posthumously honoured as a beile
 Yicong (1831–1889), the Daoguang Emperor's fifth son and Miankai's adopted son, initially a junwang, demoted to beile, then restored as a junwang in 1856 and promoted to qinwang in 1860, posthumously honoured as Prince Dunqin of the First Rank (惇勤親王)
 Zailian (載濂; 1854–1917), Yicong's eldest son, initially a second class zhenguo jiangjun, promoted to buru bafen zhenguo gong in 1864, promoted to feng'en fuguo gong in 1871, made a beile and an acting junwang in 1889, stripped of his title in 1900
 Puxiu (溥修; 1896–1956), Zailian's second son and Zaijin's adopted son, held the title of a second class zhenguo jiangjun from 1896 to 1915
 Zaiyi (1856–1923), Yicong's fifth son, adopted by Yizhi (奕誌; 1827–1850) into the Prince Rui peerage, held the title "Prince Duan of the Second Rank" (端郡王) from 1894 to 1900
 Puzhuan (溥僎; 1875–1920), Zaiyi's eldest son, held the title of a first class zhenguo jiangjun from 1894 to 1920
 Yu'an (毓侒; 1893–1979), Puzhuan's son
 Pujun (溥儁; 1885–1942), Zaiyi's second son, held the title of a buru bafen fuguo gong from 1901 to 1942
 Yuwei (毓巍; 1912–1998), Pujun's son
 Zailan (載瀾; 1856–1916), Yicong's third son, initially a third class fuguo jiangjun, promoted to second class zhenguo jiangjun in 1884, promoted to buru bafen fuguo gong in 1889, stripped of his title in 1900, posthumously restored as a buru bafen fuguo gong
 Puzhuo (溥倬; 1882–1932), Zailan's son
 Yujun (毓峻; 1905–?), Puzhuo's son
 Zaiying (載瀛; 1859–1930), Yicong's fourth son, initially a second class zhenguo jiangjun, made an acting buru bafen fuguo gong in 1894, promoted to beile in 1900, posthumously honoured as Gongke Beile (恭恪貝勒)
 Puxian (溥僩; 1901–1966), Zaiying's fifth son, held the title of a beizi from 1930
 Yuyue (毓岄; 1922–1992), Puxian's son
 Puquan (溥佺; 1913–1992), Zaiying's sixth son and Zaijin's adopted son, held the title of a second class zhenguo jiangjun from 1915 to 1945
 Zaijin (載津; 1859–1896), Yicong's fifth son, initially a second class zhenguo jiangjun, made an acting buru bafen fuguo gong in 1894, had no male heir

Family tree

See also
 Royal and noble ranks of the Qing dynasty
 Prince Rui (瑞)
 Prince Fu

References
 

Qing dynasty princely peerages
Peerages of the Bordered White Banner